The 2018 Presbyterian Blue Hose football team represented Presbyterian College in the 2018 NCAA Division I FCS football season. They were led by second-year head coach Tommy Spangler, in his second stint as PC head coach, as he coached the Blue Hose from 2001–06. The Blue Hose played their home games at Bailey Memorial Stadium as a member of the Big South Conference. They finished the season 2–8, 0–5 in Big South play to finish in last place.

Previous season
The Blue Hose finished the 2017 season 4–7, 1–4 in Big South play to finish in fifth place.

Preseason

Big South poll
In the Big South preseason poll released on July 23, 2018, the Blue Hose were predicted to finish in last place.

Preseason All-Big South team
The Big South released their preseason all-Big South team on July 23, 2018, with the Blue Hose having one player on the honorable mention list.

Honorable mention

Riley Hilton – TE

Schedule

Source:

Game summaries

at Austin Peay

Bluefield

This win was the 500th in program history for Presbyterian.

Lindsey Wilson

at Kennesaw State

Hampton

at Charleston Southern

Monmouth

at Gardner–Webb

Campbell

at Wofford

References

Presbyterian
Presbyterian Blue Hose football seasons
Presbyterian Blue Hose football